Astralarctia is a genus of moths in the family Erebidae.

Species
Astralarctia canalis
Astralarctia pulverosa
Astralarctia venatorum

References
Natural History Museum Lepidoptera generic names catalog

Phaegopterina
Moth genera